Blue Birthday is a South Korean drama web series produced by Naver subsidiary Playlist Studio. Directed by Park Dan-hee and co-written by Goo So-yeon and Moon Won-young, the series stars Kim Ye-rim as Oh Ha-rin and Yang Hong-seok as Ji Seo-jun. The series is a fantasy romance thriller drama in which the female protagonist, Oh Ha-Rin, revisits the past through mysterious photos left by her first love, who died on her birthday 10 years ago. It premiered on July 23 through Naver TV and WeTV and airs every Friday and Saturday at 19:00 (KST). It premiered on August 6 through YouTube for international audiences. However, it can only be accessed by audiences from South Korea.

Synopsis
The series tells the story of Oh Ha-Rin (Kim Ye-rim), who travels to the past through mysterious photos left by her first love, Ji Seo-Jun (Yang Hong-seok). They had been close friends since they were eight years old, but he died by suicide on her birthday ten years ago. On her 28th birthday, Ha-rin receives an exceptional opportunity as a gift; using mysterious photos left behind by Seo-Jun, Ha-Rin goes back to that day in the past to find out why he chose to die and save his life.

Plot

The series opens with Oh Ha Rin witnessing her best friend and first love, Ji Seo Jun lying in a pool of blood and dead in the photography club of their school on her 18th birthday.

10 years later, she works at the animal rescue department and gets a task to rescue an animal from her previous high school. While visiting, the traumatizing memories distracts her, yet she was able to get the job done. While getting off the job, she comes across an old photoshop and notices Seo Jun's camera in the display. Intrigued, she buys that and some old photographs from the mysterious shop owner who warns her to not get stuck in the past. Confused, she then heads Her birthday party that her friends had organized for her and leaves after one of the friends, Kim Ui Young mentioned the unexpected and mysterious suicide of Seo Jun. After going through all the photos, she decides to burn them and throws one of the nine photos into the lamp, only to wake up as a high school student in 2011. Seeing Seo Jun alive and on his bike, she thinks that it's a dream and runs toward her lost friend. She trips on the stairs but is able to catch up with him and hug him, which is caught by her now younger friends. Throughout the day, she acts weirdly and follows Seo Jun but when the time is up, she returns to reality.

That is when she realises that burning one photo from the bundle can transport you back to same date that is mentioned on the photo.

On her next travel, she finds herself watching Seo Jun's PE class where he hurts his left hand, and she recalls the police information where it was mentioned that he has cut his artery in the right hand, which would be impossible as Seo Jun was a left handed person. And when she sees him drinking soda, it strikes to her that Seo Jun didn't kill himself but was actually murdered. She tells him out loud but he brushes it off.

Ha Rin, with the help of Eun Song is able to get Sin U arrested and find out that he actually was a witness and the murderer is a female. It is then revealed that Hye Min is the real killer and with her aware of the secret of traveling back to the past, she steals all the pictures from Ha Rin's house and burn them to travel back and murders Sin U. 
When the video recorder is found, the group goes through the video and sees a girl wearing the same hairpin and jacket as their friend Do Su Jin and suspects her to be the murderer. However, she has an alibi which is revealed at the police station. Su Jin was suffering from constipation and went home by asking for a lift from a delivery person of a Chinese eatery but couldn't remember the name. The group hears it and decides to save her. With the investigation on, Seo Jun and Ha Rin finds another camera whose contents shock them to their cores. It is revealed that Ji Hye Min is the real killer and disguised herself as Su Jin to murder Kim Sin U. The girl had a troubled past and thus had developed psychopathic tendencies. She believed that Seo Jun was only a substitute and now that she has returned, he should be punished for living her life till now and be dead.
While being taken away to the prison by the officers, Hye Min tries to run away but as fated, dies in a car accident.

In the end, Ha Rin and Seo Jun were able to live happily together.

Cast

Main
 Kim Ye-rim as Oh Ha-rin
 Kim So-yoon as young Oh Ha-rin

 She lost her first love ten years ago and currently works at an abandoned animal protection center. On the day of her 18th birthday, she decided to confess her feelings to Seo-Jun, only to find him dead in their high school photography studio, and she was ultimately unable to tell him how she felt. After ten years passed, she accidentally receives mysterious photos left behind by Seo-Jun and travels back to the past numerous times to save his life.

 Yang Hong-seok as Ji Seo-jun
Moon Joo-won as young Ji Seo-jun

 Oh Ha-rin's first love who died ten years ago on her 18th birthday; according to all official reports, he died due to suicide. He was a popular student and had amicable relationships with all of his schoolmates. He also performed well academically. However, alongside a confession of his feelings in a letter to Ha-rin, he admits that he doesn't open up to others easily and can be moody and jealous underneath his bright and easygoing personality. Ha-rin finds this letter on her 28th birthday, which ultimately leads to her discovering the time travel capabilities of the photographs and her attempts to save his life.

Supporting
 Lee Sang-jun as Cha Eun-song
 A reporter from the social affairs department who had a crush on Ha-rin in the past. He was born into a wealthy family and is a positive person. He helps 28-year-old Ha-rin investigate Ji Seo-jun's death when she suspects there may be more to his case than meets the eye.

 Kim Gyeol-yu as Do Su-jin
Park So-jeong as young Do Su-jin
 Ha-rin's best friend. She is a loving and kind person who cares deeply for Ha-rin, and she understands perhaps most about the effect Seo-jun's death had on Ha-rin. She is in a relationship with Kim Ui-young.

 Park Joo-hyun as Kim Ui-young
 Do Su-jin's boyfriend and a close friend of Ha-rin and Seo-jun.

 Kim Yi-seo as Ji Hye-min
Jeong Ye-dam as young Ji Hye-min
Ji Seo-jun's older sister. She runs a cafe and takes care of her parents, who struggled after the sudden death of her brother. She is good friends with Ha-rin in the present.

 Lee Dong-joo as Kim Shin-woo
 A student who hated Ji Seo-jun. Decades later, he worked as a chemical medicine delivery agent to steal zoletil.

Special appearances
 Song Min-hyung as the photo studio owner (Ep. 1–2, 10 and 16)
 Yoo Su-bin as the senior at Seoyeon High School (Ep. 3)
 Min Chae-yeon as Ha Rin's co-worker (Ep. 5, 8-9 and 16)
 Lee Byung-jae as the detective (Ep. 9)
 Moon Sang-hoon as the Geography teacher

Episodes

Production

Development
The series is produced by Playlist, a production company known for producing several hit web drama for the 10s-20s generation, including the A-Teen, A-Teen 2 and Love Playlist series. Directed by Park Dan-hee and written by Goo So-yeon and Moon Won-young, it is a work that challenged new genres and materials by reuniting with the production team, who had gathered topics with ending series such as The Best Ending (2019) and Ending Again (2020).

Principal photography on the series wrapped in June 2021 after 3 months of filming. On June 23, the stills from filming of the series were released.

Casting
On March 30, 2021, Joy News24 announced that Kim Ye-rim and Yang Hong-seok were in talks to star in the series. Following news reported the script reading held in Seoul on April 5, 2021, Ye-rim and Hong-seok confirmed as the protagonist of the series. On May 14, Lee Sang-jun was confirmed to be joining the cast and followed by Kim Gyeol-yu on May 25.

Marketing
Kim Ye-rim and Yang Hong-seok appeared on SBS Power FM's Wendy's Young Street, Naver NOW's Seulgi.zip and KBS Cool FM's Kang Han-na's Volume Up on July 16, 20 and 21, respectively.

Release
A teaser video was released on June 10 on the occasion of Ha-rin's birthday. The production team explained, "This video contains the meaning of 'Blue Birthday', the first love who chose death on the day of her birthday. Through the videos and images that will be released, the inner story will be revealed little by little." The series aired on Naver TV on July 23. It will be premiered on YouTube on August 6.

Original soundtrack
The soundtrack for Blue Birthday consists of three songs, including remakes of two popular Korean songs that were released in 2011.

Part 1

Part 2

Part 3

Part 4

Chart performance

Reception
Since its first broadcast in July, Blue Birthday has ranked first among all Korean content on AbemaTV, a platform for simultaneous broadcasting in Japan. In China, it ranked 7th as the most popular video among all Korean content on streaming sites, and a kind of open chat room was operated to share pictures of the main characters and talk about the drama in real time. The number of visitors to the fan page in China reached about 3.58 million. In addition to this, the global OTT platform Viki, which is being serviced in the America, Europe, and Oceania, contains 'Best reversal and suspense! Recommendation'.

Accolades

Remake
A Japanese television drama remake titled Blue Birthday (ブルーバースデー), starring Shion Tsurubo and Airi Matsui  will air on Kansai Telecasting Corporation starting February 8, 2023. The series featured "Romance" by JO1 as the official theme song for the series.

References

External links
 
 

2021 web series debuts
Fantasy web series
Korean-language television shows
Naver TV original programming
Playlist Studio original programming
South Korean drama web series
South Korean television series remade in other languages
2021 web series endings